Li Jia (born May 4, 1981) is a retired female Chinese table tennis player most active between 2000, and 2003. She was left handed.

From Jinzhou, Liaoning, she began playing table tennis at the age of 7, and was selected for the provincial team in 1990. In 1997, she joined the national team. She was known for her doubles play. She won the world women's club championships in 2000, the national championships (women's doubles), and placed third in the singles competition that year. In 2001, she placed third in singles at Korea Open, and was the champion in doubles. She also placed third on the international circuit competition. In 2002, she placed third in women's doubles at the Egypt Open, but was the champion in the Qatar, Germany, and Netherlands Open competitions. She placed third in women's doubles at the 47th World Table Tennis Championships.

References

1981 births
Living people
Chinese female table tennis players
People from Jinzhou
Table tennis players from Liaoning
21st-century Chinese women